Catan is a PlayStation 3 video game developed by Game Republic. Catan is an original adaptation of Klaus Teuber's board game The Settlers of Catan; it is not a port of the 2007 XBLA adaptation by Big Huge Games. The download was released in Japan on December 18, 2008 for 1200 yen. The game has since expanded to other territories.

Although only one player is supported offline, the online multiplayer mode allows for four players to go against each other. The game features both 1080p graphics and 5.1 surround sound.

A unique feature of the game is that it fully supports game launching. Game launching is a feature for PlayStation Home that lets users launch multi-player games in Home.

Sometime before 18 March 2012, the game was removed from PlayStation Store.

References

2008 video games
Game Republic games
PlayStation 3 games
PlayStation 3-only games
PlayStation Network games
Catan
Video games based on board games
Video games developed in Japan
Multiplayer and single-player video games

PhyreEngine games